Gerbi is a surname. Notable people with the surname include:

Giovanni Gerbi (1885–1955), Italian cyclist
Julien Gerbi (born 1985), French racing driver
Veronica Gerbi, Italian curler
Yarden Gerbi (born 1989), Israeli judoka

See also
Estiva Gerbi, town in Brazil